Maurice Levitas (February 1, 1917-February 14, 2001) was an Irish academic and communist, most famous for fighting for the International Brigades against forces backed by Hitler and Mussolini during the Spanish Civil War.

Biography 
Levitas was born at Warren Street, in the Portobello area of Dublin. He was known to his family and friends as "Morry". His parents, Harry Levitas and Leah Rick, having emigrated to Ireland from Lithuania and Latvia in 1912, were married in the Camden Street Synagogue in Dublin. Harry Levitas was a member of the Tailors and Pressers Union, known in Dublin as the Jewish Union.Maurice attended St Peter's Church of Ireland National School.
In 1927, the family emigrated to Britain, first to Glasgow then to London, Maurice Levitas joined the Communist Party of Great Britain in 1933 and was also an active trade unionist. He and his brothers Max and Sol, were involved in the 1936 ‘Battle of Cable Street’ against the British Union of Fascists.

In 1937, he joined the Connolly Column of the International Brigade and fought in the Spanish Civil War. He was captured in 1938 and released in February 1939.

In 1942, Levitas enlisted in the Royal Army Medical Corps and served in India and Burma. In 1948, having resumed employment as a plumber, he was offered a place in an emergency Teachers' Training College.

In 1964, Levitas graduated with an honours degree in sociology from the University of London and became a senior lecturer in the sociology of education at Durham University. Levitas remained an ardent Marxist–Leninist and a supporter of the Soviet Union, remaining a Communist Party member. This was tested by the invasion of Czechoslovakia to put down the Prague Spring of 1968. He emigrated to the Marxist–Leninist controlled regime of East Germany in 1985 to work as an English teacher, authoring a work praising Erich Honecker.

He attended the commemoration of the Connolly Column in 1991 in Liberty Hall, Dublin, where he was chosen to read out the list of members. He also attended, in 1997, a ceremony in the Mansion House by the Lord Mayor of the surviving Irish members of the International Brigade. He returned to England in 1990 following the fall of the Berlin Wall. He died in London on 14 February 2001. His brother Max Levitas (1 June 1915 – 2 November 2018) was Communist councillor for 15 years in Stepney in London. His daughter is the sociologist Ruth Levitas and his son is the theatre historian Ben Levitas.

Publications 
 Marxist Perspectives in the Sociology of Education by Maurice Levitas (1974)
 Erich Honecker Cross Examined edited and translated by Maurice Levitas(1992)

References 

1917 births
2001 deaths
Academics of Durham University
Alumni of the University of London
International Brigades personnel
Irish Jews
Irish anti-fascists
Irish communists
Irish people of Lithuanian-Jewish descent
Irish people of the Spanish Civil War
Irish sociologists
People from Portobello, Dublin
Royal Army Medical Corps soldiers
Irish emigrants to the United Kingdom